Metronome (メトロノーム) is a Japanese visual kei rock band, which took its influence from many genres, including techno, rock, hardcore and pop.

Musical styles
They have also been described as gamewave and nintendocore. Their songs typically sampled video game, or video game inspired, sounds and while being based in rock, are heavily electronic as well. They have a total of 22 official releases, albums and singles. They maintained an indie career throughout their years, and were never a hot selling band among the visual kei scene, mainly due to their uncompromising approach to their sound.

History
Metronome's claim to fame is that they travelled from the future—The year 2005, to be exact. Because they were getting bad record sales in 2005, they decided to travel back in time to 1998, thus boosting sales via their "futuristic" sound and look.

In a 2007 interview, Talbo-1 Fukusuke mentioned how they stopped with saying they were from the year 2005 as said year neared. The band apparently had thought they wouldn't still be around by the time 2005 rolled around. They split in 2009 for unknown reasons.

Later in 2016 the band got back together after being asked if during band members solo projects if they would perform covers of Metronome song which they responded that if they were to perform Metronome songs they were going to do it right. This led to their first single since their break up being released. The next year they released a new full-length album.

Members 

Voicecoder: Sharaku Kobayashi 小林　写楽 {シャラク}
Birthday: 08.10
Current Bands: metronome, FLOPPY, Muchi muchi Anago, Cuckoo (カッコー), GalapagosS
Previous Bands: Picopico PON, Propellerheads

Talbo-1: Fukusuke Fukuda {フクスケ}
Birthday: 12.09
Current Bands: metronome, ADAPTER
Previous Bands: Picopico PON
Support for: FLOPPY

Talbo-2: Riu {リウ}
Birthday: 06.01
Current Bands: metronome, BEE-315
Previous Bands: SPICY DRY HOT MUSTARD

Drums: Shintarou {シンタロー}
Birthday: 11.23
Current Bands: metronome, GalapagosS
Previous Bands:

Ex members
Drums: Yuuichirou {ユウイチロー}
Birthday: 09.28
Current Bands: boogieman
Previous Bands: Fill or Kill, FeNeK, BADxTIMING, Mind Break, CUVE, metronome

Discography
Albums
YAPUU Ga Shoukansareta Machi (2000)
Fukigen Na ANDROID (2002)
1 Metronome (2003)
UNKNOWN (2004)
LIFO (2004)
Electric Travel (2005)
Cycle Recycle (2007)
HIGH TO LOW ELECTRO (2008)
COLLECTION (2008)
COLLECTION 2 (2008)
CONTINUE (2017)

Singles
Single Top Religion (1999)
PLASTIC-MODELS Kuro (2001)
PLASTIC-MODELS Shirogane (2001)
Planet (2002)
Self Control (2002)
Mittsu Kazoero (2003)
S.P.A.C.E. Romantic (2003)
Mousou Trick (2004)
Isshukan (2004)
Computer (2004)
Oboro/Sora (2005)
Boku Sonzaisetsu (2006)
Zetsubou-San (2006)
Tawainai Twillight (2007)
Zombie-Kun (2007)
Kairisei Doitsujinbutsu (2016)

DVD
サイクルリサイクル～メーDAY X'mas～ (2007)
10th Anniversary Special ONE MAN LIVE
＠2008.8.25SHIBUYA-AX
since2005→1998→2008 (2009)

External links
Official Site
Profile at JaME

Japanese punk rock groups
Japanese rock music groups
Visual kei musical groups